GZU may refer to:

Great Zimbabwe University
Guizhou University